Province of Pola (in Italian Provincia di Pola) was a province of the Kingdom of Italy created after World War I, that officially existed from 1923 until 1947. The capital ("Capoluogo" in Italian) was Pola. After the Second World War the Province of Pola became part of Yugoslavia. Following the collapse of Yugoslavia in 1991, the Province of Pola has been part of Croatia.

Demographics 
The Province of Pola was divided in 1938 into 42 "Comuni" (municipalities) and had an area of 3,718 km2 with a population of 294,492 inhabitants (80 ab./km2). It was located in the peninsula of Istria.

The 1921 Italian Census showed that in the Province there were 199,942 Italians (67%) and 90.262 Croats (23%), with 9% of Slovenians and Austrians, most of them former employees of the Habsburg empire. The city of Pola had 41,125 Italians (91%) and 5,420 Croats (9%). In the Province there was a small community of Istro-Romanians, concentrated around the Valdarsa area in central Istria.

Nearly 96% of the population was Catholic and they were members of the Roman Catholic Diocese of Parenzo and Pola, in those years within the ecclesiastical province of Arcidiocesi di Gorizia.

History 
The Province of Pola was created in January 1923 with "Regio Decreto # 53" after Italy's victory in World War I that united Istria to the Kingdom of Italy: it was the former Margraviate of Istria with the islands of the Quarnaro, Cherso and Lussino.

Initially, the province was made of all the areas of Istria. It was also made up of less Muggia and other small municipalities united to the Province of Trieste. But in 1924, the area of "Circondario di Volosca-Abbazia" -less the municipalities of Castelnuovo d'Istria and Matteria- was united to the Province of Fiume

Following the collapse of Austria-Hungary in 1918, Pola and the whole of Istria – except the territory of Castua – were assigned to Italy.

Pola became the capital of the newly created "Province of Pola". The city's decline in population after World War I was mainly due to economic difficulties caused by the withdrawal of Austro-Hungarian military and bureaucratic facilities and the dismissal of workers from the shipyard.

Under the Italian Fascist government of Benito Mussolini, non-Italians, especially Slavic residents, faced a political and cultural repression, and some fled the city of Pola and Istria altogether.

After the collapse of Fascist Italy in September 1943, the city and the province were occupied by the German Army as part of the Operational Zone of the Adriatic Littoral. Consequently, the province was subjected to repeated Allied bombing from 1943 until the end of 1944. In the last phase of the war Pola and the province saw arrests, deportations and executions of people suspected of aiding Tito's partisans.

In the early 1930s, the Ferrovia istriana and the railways station of Pola were improved, while in 1935 the Ferrovia Parenzana was closed (an old narrow gauge railway). New navigation lines from Istria were added, mainly toward Trieste, Venice and Ancona; a weekly ship service that connected all the minor ports of Istria from Trieste to Pola and to Fiume was created. From 1935 the "Adriatica di Navigazione" connected Pola with Zara and Ancona for large modern ships.

In the 1930s, the Province of Pola enjoyed an economic revival based on minerary exploitation (coal in Valdarsa) and infrastructure investments. The Via Flavia -from Trieste to Pola- was enlarged and reduced in distance; the railways were improved and the water facilities increased with the new "Acquedotto istriano". The port and shipyard of Pola were increased with modern military facilities, while an airport was built in the same area.

Even tourism stated to be increased, mainly to the Roman ruins of Pola: in 1938, the Italian region of Istria had 129,838 foreign visitors.

List of prefects of the Province of Pola (1923–45)

See also 
Provinces of Italy
Province of Fiume
Province of Trieste
Catholic Diocese of Pola

Notes and references

Notes

References

Bibliography 
 
 

Pola
States and territories established in 1923
States and territories disestablished in 1947
History of Istria